Paul Sheehy (born August 14, 1963) is an American former Rugby union footballer for the United States. He started four matches for the U.S. in 1991–1992, including two starts at the 1991 Rugby World Cup.  His position was fullback.

Sheehy was born in Washington D.C. He was a four-year member of the Fairfield University rugby team, and he received his bachelor's degree from Fairfield University. Sheehy also played for the Washington Rugby Football Club from 1991 to 1993, and is now a member of the Washington Rugby Football Club Hall of Fame.

Coaching and administration
Sheehy is an assistant backs coach at his alma mater Gonzaga College High School in Washington DC. Sheehy is one of the founders of the Old Glory DC, a professional rugby team that is scheduled to begin play in 2020 in Major League Rugby.

References

External links 
Washington Rugby Football Club

American rugby union players
Rugby union fullbacks
Fairfield University alumni
1963 births
Living people
United States international rugby union players
Gonzaga College High School alumni